Tyla is a rural locality (a village) in Gaynskoye Rural Settlement, Gaynsky District, Perm Krai, Russia. The population was 11 as of 2010. There is 1 street.

Geography 
Tyla is located 19 km south of Gayny (the district's administrative centre) by road. Vaskino is the nearest rural locality.

References 

Rural localities in Gaynsky District